Viridomarus or Britomartus as translations vary, (died 222 BC) was a Gaulish military leader who led an army against an army of the Roman Republic at the Battle of Clastidium.  The Romans won the battle, and in the process, Marcus Claudius Marcellus, the Roman leader, earned the spolia opima by killing Viridomarus in single combat.

References

Celtic warriors
Gaulish rulers
3rd-century BC rulers
Year of birth unknown
222 BC deaths